Milton Moses Ginsberg (September 22, 1935May 23, 2021) was an American film director and editor. He was noted for writing and directing Coming Apart, a 1969 film starring Rip Torn and Sally Kirkland, and The Werewolf of Washington starring Dean Stockwell.

Early life
Ginsberg was born in The Bronx on September 22, 1935. His father, Elias, was employed as a cutter in the garment district; his mother, Fannie (Weis), was a housewife. He attended the Bronx High School of Science, before studying literature at Columbia University, where he obtained a bachelor's degree.

Career

Coming Apart
Ginsberg directed his first feature film, Coming Apart, in 1969. It starred Rip Torn as a mentally disturbed psychologist who secretly films his sexual encounters with women. Sally Kirkland, who was simultaneously filming Futz! at the time, also stars. The film was shot in a one-room,  apartment in Kips Bay Plaza, on a budget of $60,000. Shooting lasted three weeks. Ginsberg filmed the entire movie with one static camera setup, in a manner simulating a non-constructed "fake documentary" style, influenced by Jim McBride's David Holzman's Diary.

Critical reception was mixed. Life reviewer Richard Schickel praised Torn's performance, Ginsberg's inventive use of camera and sound, and the "illuminating" portrayal of a schizophrenic breakdown. Critic Andrew Sarris gave it a less-favorable review, and the film was a commercial failure. The film later attained a cult following among critics and filmmakers.

In a 1999 volume of Film Comment, Ginsberg stated:

Subsequent work
In 1973, Ginsberg wrote and directed the satirical horror film The Werewolf of Washington starring Dean Stockwell. Eschewing the minimalism of his previous feature, Ginsberg demonstrated a more technically complex film style.

After a diagnosis of non-Hodgkin's Lymphoma in 1975, Ginsberg became depressed and withdrew from filmmaking. He returned to directing in 1999 and 2001, with the short films The City Below the Line and The Haloed Bird.

After his final feature film, Ginsberg primarily made a living as a film editor, working on two Academy Award-winning documentaries, Down and Out in America and The Personals, among others. He edited both parts of the miniseries Fidel (2002) for director David Attwood.

Personal life
Ginsberg married Nina Posnansky, a painter, in 1983. They remained married until his death.

Ginsberg died on May 23, 2021, at his apartment in Manhattan. He was 85, and suffered from cancer prior to his death.

Filmography

References

External links

1935 births
2021 deaths
Artists from New York City
Film directors from New York City
People from the Bronx
Columbia College (New York) alumni